Charles Prickett was an English cricketer who made two first-class appearances for Kent sides in 1826.

Prickett's two first-class matches were just a week apart, both against Sussex. In the first, despite scoring a duck in the first innings, he made his best score of 7 in the second.

In his second fixture, Kent won comfortably, with Prickett in the opening position in the order. Despite losing his opening batting partner John Noakes for a duck in the second innings, Prickett finished not out, as the team scored a nine-wicket victory.

References

English cricketers
Kent cricketers
Year of death missing
Year of birth missing